This is a list of crime films released in 1997.

References

1997